Ardtole is a townland of 431 acres in County Down, Northern Ireland, near Ardglass. It is situated in the civil parish of Ardglass and the historic barony of Lecale Lower. The southern part of Ardtole townland is known as English Ardtole and the northern part is known as Irish Ardtole.

The townland contains the remains of Ardtole Church, a 15th-century ruined church dedicated to St Nicholas (grid ref: J564382). Close by is a holy well, known as St Patrick's Well.

See also
List of townlands in County Down

References

Townlands of County Down
Civil parish of Ardglass